Kim Yong-hee (born October 4, 1955, in Busan) is a retired player and former manager in the KBO League.

A graduate of Kyungnam High School and Korea University, Kim played for the silver medal-winning South Korea national baseball team at the 1981 World Games.

With the formation of the KBO League in 1982, Kim joined the Lotte Giants, for whom he played all eight seasons of his career. He won the KBO League Golden Glove Award three times, twice at third base and once at designated hitter.

After retiring at age 33 in 1989, Kim got directly into coaching, also for the Giants. He coached for the Giants at the KBO level from 1989 to 1992, and was promoted to the team's manager in 1994. He left the Giants after the 1998 season to coach for the Samsung Lions; he was the Lions' manager for the 2000 season.

Kim returned to Lotte as a coach from 2001 to 2006; he served as caretaker manager for part of 2002.

After leaving the KBO for awhile, Kim joined the SK Wyverns as a coach for 2012–2013. He was the manager of the Wyverns in 2015–2016.

References

External links
Career statistics and player information from Korea Baseball Organization

SSG Landers managers
Samsung Lions managers
Lotte Giants managers
SSG Landers coaches
Lotte Giants coaches
Samsung Lions coaches
Lotte Giants players
KBO League designated hitters
KBO League third basemen
South Korean baseball players
Korea University alumni
Kyungnam High School alumni
Sportspeople from Busan
1955 births
Living people
Gimhae Kim clan
South Korean Buddhists
Competitors at the 1981 World Games